Hugo Paul Friedrich Schulz (August 6, 1853 – July 13, 1932) was a German pharmacologist from Wesel, Rhenish Prussia.

He studied medicine in the universities of Heidelberg and Bonn, where he did scientific work in the physiological institute of Eduard Friedrich Wilhelm Pflüger (1829-1910). In 1877 he earned his doctorate, and afterwards worked in the pharmacological institute of Karl Binz (1832-1913) at Bonn. In 1883 he was appointed professor of pharmacology at the University of Greifswald.

Schulz is known for his research of a phenomenon known as hormesis, showing that toxins can have the opposite effect in small doses than in large doses. This he demonstrated in experiments using chemical compounds on yeast cells. From his research came the "Arndt-Schulz rule", a law concerning dosages in toxicology; named along with Dr. Rudolf Arndt (1835-1900).

Schultz published a number of works in the field of pharmacology, including the well-regarded Pharmakotherapie (1898), a treatise that was included in Albert Eulenburg's Handbuch der allgemeinen Therapie und der therapeutischen Methodik.

Works
 Die officinellen Pflanzen und Pflanzenpräparate : zum Gebrauch für Studirende und Ärzte übersichtlich zusammengestellt . Bergmann, Wiesbaden 1885 Digital edition by the University and State Library Düsseldorf

References
 Hugo Paul Friedrich Schulz @ Who Named It

1853 births
1932 deaths
19th-century German chemists
German pharmacologists
People from Wesel
People from the Rhine Province
Heidelberg University alumni
University of Bonn alumni
Academic staff of the University of Greifswald
20th-century German chemists